Alice Koller Leopold (May 9, 1906 in Scranton, Pennsylvania – 1982) was an American politician, social activist, and government official. She served as Secretary of the State of Connecticut from 1951 to 1953 and as Director of the United States Women's Bureau from 1953 to 1961.

Early life and business career
Alice Koller was the daughter of E. Leonard Koller (1872-1953) and Leonora Edwards Koller (1881-1942). She graduated from Goucher College in Towson, Maryland in 1927, double-majoring in English and economics. After a training course, she became an assistant buyer for Hutzler's, a major Baltimore department store. She soon advanced to being personnel director, first for the female employees and then for all employees. She was later personnel director for B. Altman and Company, a New York City department store.

In 1931 Koller married New York advertising executive Joseph Leopold and became a homemaker, raising the couple's two children, Robert (1934-2004) and John. While raising her sons she started a successful toy company based on designs she had made herself for places to park toy vehicles.

Political career
While her sons were in the Weston, Connecticut public schools, Alice Leopold organized a hot lunch program for the students and became the president of the local Parent Teacher Association. She also worked with the League of Women Voters. In 1949 Leopold was elected as a Republican to the Connecticut House of Representatives from Weston. She introduced a minimum wage law which passed in the next session and an equal pay law which was passed in that session. In 1950 she was elected Secretary of State. In 1953 her office produced a general revision of election laws which successfully passed the legislature.

In November 1953 Leopold resigned to be director of the United States Women's Bureau, first as a recess appointment by President Dwight D. Eisenhower and then confirmed by the Senate in January 1954. Eisenhower probably replaced the previous director, Frieda S. Miller, in an effort to mute Women's Bureau opposition to the Equal Rights Amendment. Leopold focused the Bureau more on the problems of professional women and on women re-entering the workforce after raising children, as she had herself. In 1954 she was given the additional title of Assistant to the Secretary of Labor for Women's Affairs. In 1956 she persuaded Eisenhower to add a call for equal pay to his State of the Union address, and the call was repeated for the remainder of Eisenhower's administration.

In 1958 Leopold was given an honorary Doctor of Laws by Rutgers University. She received Rockford College's Jane Addams Medal in 1960, an award given to women who, like Addams, "are pioneers in their professions, outstanding in character, and recognized for their contributions to the arts, sciences, and society".

During the Nixon administration Leopold served on a Health Services Industry Committee which was intended to develop measures to reduce inflation in the health care industry. She is listed as living in San Francisco, California at the time.

Burial
Leopold is buried in the Chestnut Hill Cemetery in Glen Rock, Pennsylvania with her parents. Some of her papers are in the Schlesinger Library at Harvard University.

References

1906 births
1982 deaths
Goucher College alumni
People from Scranton, Pennsylvania
People from Weston, Connecticut
20th-century American businesswomen
20th-century American businesspeople
Women state legislators in Connecticut
Members of the Connecticut House of Representatives
Secretaries of the State of Connecticut
20th-century American politicians
20th-century American women politicians